David John Hopetoun Watson (born 29 January 1945) is an Australian former politician.

Early life 
Born in Sydney, Watson was educated at the University of Queensland and Ohio State University before becoming an accountant. He was Professor of Accounting and Dean of Commerce and Economics at the University of Queensland before entering politics.

Politics 
In 1984, Watson was elected to the Australian House of Representatives as the Liberal member for Forde. He was defeated in the next federal election in 1987, but in 1989 was elected to the Legislative Assembly of Queensland as the member for Moggill. He was the Queensland Minister for Housing and Public Works 1997–1998 and Leader of the Queensland Liberal Party 1998–2001. As state Liberal leader and Deputy Leader of the Opposition, he led the Liberals into the 2001 state election, which saw Labor reelected in a record landslide. Watson himself was nearly swept up in that year's massive Labor wave, surviving by only 396 votes. He was left as the only non-Labor MLA from Brisbane.

References

1945 births
Living people
Liberal Party of Australia members of the Parliament of Australia
Liberal Party of Australia members of the Parliament of Queensland
Ohio State University alumni
University of Queensland alumni
Members of the Australian House of Representatives for Forde
Members of the Australian House of Representatives
Members of the Queensland Legislative Assembly
21st-century Australian politicians
20th-century Australian politicians